Mozaffarabad (also Romanized as Moz̧affarābād; also known as Moz̧affarābād-e Rāyen and Muzaffarābād) is a village in Rayen Rural District, Rayen District, Kerman County, Kerman Province, Iran. At the 2006 census, its population was 71, in 21 families.

References 

Populated places in Kerman County